Events in the year 2017 in Kerala

Incumbents 
Governor of Kerala – P. Sathasivam

Chief minister of Kerala – Pinarayi Vijayan

Events 

 January 3 – Kerala Rail Development Corporation is incorporated.
 January 6 - Jishnu Pranoy, an 18 year old engineering student of Nehru College of Engineering and Research Centre commits suicide following torture from college authorities.
 March 6 - In relation to corruption case in Malabar Cements Limited, industrialist V.M. Radhakrishnan surrendered before Vigilance and Anti Corruption Bureau, Kerala.
 March 26 – Minister A. K. Saseendran resigns following sexual misconduct charges.
 June 17 - Prime Minister Narendra Modi inaugurates Kochi Metro.
 July 3 – The Supreme Court of India declares the Constitution of the Malankara Orthodox Church legal and valid, and applicable to all the parishes under the control of both Jacobite and Orthodox factions in the K.S. Varghese & Others v/s St Peter's & Paul's Syrian Orthodox Church & Others case.
 October 21 – District magistrate Alappuzha, T. V. Anupama submits a report to Government of Kerala which confirms that the Lake Palace resort owned by Minister of Transport Thomas Chandy violated the Kerala Conservation of Paddy Land and Wet Land Act 2008 by encroaching upon Kuttanad paddy fields and Vembanad wetlands.
 November 15 – Minister of Transport Thomas Chandy resigns following allegations about him over Lake Palace resort, Alappuzha.

Deaths 

 March 13 – Diphan, 45, film director
 April 13 – Munshi Venu, 63, actor
 August 28 – Santhi Mohandas, 36, dancer and wife of Bijibal
 October 24 – I. V. Sasi, 69, film director
 November 30 – Kalabhavan Abi, 52, mimicry artist

See also 

 History of Kerala
 2017 in India

References 

2010s in Kerala